Kingfield is a census-designated place (CDP) and the primary village in the town of Kingfield, Franklin County, Maine, United States. It is in the southeastern part of the town, along the Carrabassett River where it is joined by its West Branch. It is bordered partly to the south by the town of New Portland in Somerset County.

State Routes 16 and 27 join in the village, together leading north  to Carrabassett Valley. Route 16 leads southeast from Kingfield  to North Anson, while Route 27 leads south  to Farmington. Route 142 leads southwest out of Kingfield  to Phillips.

Kingfield was first listed as a CDP prior to the 2020 census.

Demographics

References 

Census-designated places in Franklin County, Maine
Census-designated places in Maine